Hatley may refer to:

Places
 Hatley, Georgia, USA
 Hatley, Wisconsin, USA
 Hatley, Mississippi, USA
 Hatley, Cambridgeshire, England, UK
 Hatley Park, a neighbourhood in Colwood, British Columbia, Canada
 Hatley Park National Historic Site, a castle and park in Colwood, British Columbia, Canada
 Hatley, Quebec (municipality), Canada
 Hatley, Quebec (township), Canada

Other uses
 Hatley (surname)
 Hatley (brand)